The IFFI Best Film Award (officially known as the Golden Peacock for the Best Feature Film) is the Main Prize of the International Film Festival of India presented annually by the Directorate of Film Festivals, the organisation set up by Ministry of Information and Broadcasting in India. It is one of several awards presented for feature films and awarded with the Golden Peacock a representation of the Peacock, India’s national bird, with a permanent motto of the festival ‘Vasudhaiva Kutumbakam’ (The whole world is a family). The award is announced for films produced in a year across the world. The award was instituted in 1965 from the 3rd IFFI competitive edition.

Feature Film Awards

Golden Peacock Award winners (Best Feature Film)
The award carries a cash prize of  shared equally between the director and producer. The director will receive the 'Golden Peacock' and a certificate in addition to the cash prize. The Producer will receive a certificate in addition to the cash.

Silver Peacock Award winners (Best Feature Film - Discontinued)

Short Film Awards

Golden Peacock Award winners (Best Short Film - Discontinued)

Special Awards for Short Films at the 42nd IFFI
Vasudha award for “A Pestering Journey” by K. R. Manoj 
Second prize of Golden Lamp Tree:  “Another Planet” by Smita Bhide 
Silver Lamp Tree award: “Crazy Beats Strong Every Time’ by Mool Monson
International Jury Prize: “Khule Darwaze” by Ashish Pande
Special Jury Prize: "Anthony Gonsolves" by Ashok Rane

References

External links
Official Page for Directorate of Film Festivals, India

Lists of Indian award winners
International Film Festival of India
Indian film festivals
Festivals in Goa
Awards for best film